Kammerkaroceras is an extinct cephalopod genus from the Lower Jurassic belonging to the ammonoid family Psiloceratidae.

The shell of Kammerkaroceras is involute, all whorls except for the outermost hidden from view, discoidal with sigmoidal ribs that branch on the sides and cross over the rounded venter.

References

 W. J. Arkell et al., 1957. Mesozoic Ammonoidea. Treatise on Invertebrate Paleongology, Part L. Geological Society of America and University of Kansas Press.

Psiloceratidae
Ammonitida genera
Jurassic ammonites
Ammonites of Europe
Hettangian life